Anokha – Soundz of the Asian Underground is a compilation album.

Background 

This 1997 album arose from the Anokha music club night, formed by its host Talvin Singh and Sweety Kapoor, with music producer/DJ State of Bengal a.k.a. Zam Zaman.
Anokha held weekly sessions at the legendary Blue Note venue at Hoxton Square in London's East End. The album was marketed by Mango Records, a division of Island Records. Those music sessions and this compilation helped to promote the rise of the Asian Underground movement.

The compilation was signed via Anokha's imprint label Omni Records to Island Records and led to major label deals for Talvin Singh, State of Bengal and Amar.

Critical reception 

Reviewing for The Village Voice in December 1997, Robert Christgau appraised the album negatively: "With zip to do with bhangra, and no commitment to drum 'n' bass, here's a travelogue designed to remind us that tabla players (presenter Talvin Singh, for instance!) have been hand-producing something like breakbeats for years. Not exactly like breakbeats, though. Anyway, who buys records solely for breakbeats? (Wait, I don't want to know.)" AllMusic's John Bush was more enthusiastic, deeming it "a startlingly natural-sounding fusion of Indian music and instruments with drum'n'bass, breakbeats and electronics, unlike other worldbeat-influenced electronic recordings which feature an abundance of styles but rarely approach true fusion." Bush highlighted Singh and State of Bengal's songs, as well as "K-Ascendant" by Kingsuk Biswas.

Track listing

References

External links 
 

1997 compilation albums
Talvin Singh albums